Marine Drive is a 3 kilometre-long  Promenade along the Netaji Subhash Chandra Bose Road in Mumbai, India. The road and promenade were constructed by Pallonji Mistry. It is a 'C'-shaped six-lane concrete road along the coast of a natural bay. At the northern end of Marine Drive is Girgaon Chowpatty and the adjacent road along links Nariman Point at southern tip to Babulnath and Malabar Hill at northern tip. Marine Drive is situated on reclaimed land facing west-south-west. Marine Drive is also known as the Queen's Necklace because, when viewed at night from an elevated point anywhere along the drive, the street lights resemble a string of pearls in a necklace.

The official name for this road, though rarely used, is Netaji Subhash Chandra Bose Road. The promenade is lined with palm trees. At the northern end of Marine Drive is Chowpatty Beach. This is a popular beach famed for its Bhel Puri (local fast food). Many restaurants also line this stretch of the road. Further down this road lies Walkeshwar, a wealthy neighborhood of the city, also home to the Governor of Maharashtra.

Most of the buildings erected by wealthy Parsis were constructed in an art deco style, which was popular in the 1920s and 1930s. Among the earliest art deco buildings on Marine Drive were the Kapur Mahal, Zaver Mahal and Keval Mahal, built between 1937 and 1939 for a total cost of 1 million rupees.

Real estate prices along the Esplanade are high. Many hotels dot the drive, most prominent among them being the 5-star Oberoi (formerly the Oberoi Hilton Tower however reverted to the original name as of early 2008), The Intercontinental, Hotel Marine Plaza, Sea Green Hotel and a few other smaller hotels. Marine Drive is the preferred connecting road between the central business district located at Nariman Point and the rest of the city.

Many Sports Clubs, some of cricket stadium and club grounds are situated along the stretch of Marine Drive, including members-only clubs like the Cricket Club of India (CCI), adjoining the Brabourne Stadium, Hindu Gymkhana Ground and Garware Club House, adjacent to the famous Wankhede Stadium, as well as others like the Mumbai Police Gymkhana, Hindu Gymkhana, Parsi Gymkhana and Islam Gymkhana.

A well known singer from the 1950s, Suraiya lived in a building on the stretch known as 'Krishna Mahal' in the ground-floor apartment (as a tenant of Shah family) from 1940s until her death on 31 January 2004. The house was first taken on rent by her mother, Mumtaz Begum. Many other film stars, such as Nargis and Raj Kapoor, lived nearby in the 1940s and 50s.

In 2012, the Municipal Corporation of Greater Mumbai announced that the entire road would be resurfaced, 72 years after it was originally laid. A number of bollards were also installed as there was nothing to prevent accidents or attacks. A few years earlier, the footpaths were renovated.

Notable places 
Places situated near Marine drive road :

 Cricket centre - The headquarters of Board of Control for Cricket in India (BCCI) and Indian Premier League (IPL) situated inside premises of Wankhede stadium. 
 Headquarter of Mumbai Cricket Association, governing body for cricket in Mumbai district.

Major events

Incidents, events happened on this place as of 14 October 2022 :

 IAF airshow, 17 October 2004
 Mumbai Marathon (every year since) 9 February 2004 — an international marathon.
 International Fleet Review 19 February 2001 — The world's major navies took part in the IFR.
 French Festival 1988.
 Terror attacks in 1993, 2003 and 2008: terrorists attacked targets near here and in other parts of the city. One of them, Ajmal Kasab crashed a stolen car after driving it over a traffic island at Marine Drive and was apprehended. Two of Kasab's fellow terrorists, (identified as Fahadullah and Adult Rehman alias AR Chota) attacked the Trident and Oberoi hotels and murdered 30 people in 3 days with assault rifles, pistols and explosives before being gunned down by National Security Guard (NSG) commandos.

See also
 Palm Beach Marg, Navi Mumbai
 Corniche, a similar area in many other cities worldwide, including Abu Dhabi

References
https://www.frommers.com/destinations/mumbai/attractions/marine-drive--chowpatty-beach

External links

Marine Drive turns 100
Marine Drive Refurbishment Project

Streets in Mumbai
Boulevards
Neighbourhoods in Mumbai
Tourist attractions in Mumbai
Waterfronts
Year of establishment missing